"Big River" is a song written and performed by English singer and actor Jimmy Nail, included on his fourth studio album of the same name. The song was released as a single on 16 October 1995, reaching number 18 on the UK Singles Chart and number 10 in Hungary. In 2011, it was recorded by Joe McElderry for the DVD, Big River Big Songs: The Tyne. McElderry also performed it for Sunday for Sammy in 2012.

Background
The big river referred to in the title is the River Tyne that runs through Nail's home town, Newcastle upon Tyne. The song is an elegy to the days when shipbuilding and industry in general were at their height in Newcastle and laments the later decline of the industry and therefore the decline of the importance and activity of the Tyne itself. However, in the last chorus, the song takes a more hopeful turn, declaring that, "the river will rise again".

The guitar work on the song was provided by Dire Straits frontman Mark Knopfler, who features in the music video. The song was adopted as an anthem by female workers in Liverpool during a lockout the following winter.

Track listings
UK 7-inch single
A. "Big River" – 5:59
B. "Bitter and Twisted" (live version) – 4:08

UK and European CD single
 "Big River" – 5:59
 "Bitter and Twisted" (live version) – 4:08
 "What Kind of a Man Am I?" (live version) – 5:32

UK CD single 2
 "Big River" – 5:59
 "Bitter and Twisted" (live version) – 4:08
 "What Kind of a Man Am I?" (live version) – 5:32
 "Big River" (radio edit) – 4:17

Charts

References

1995 singles
1995 songs
Jimmy Nail songs
Songs about rivers
Songs related to Newcastle upon Tyne